Vossburg is an unincorporated community in Jasper County, Mississippi, United States. Its ZIP code is 39366.

History
Vossburg is located on the Norfolk Southern Railway. The community was incorporated in 1900. The incorporation charter was repealed on March 17 in 1904.

The community was once home to an express mail office, four stores, a church, school, and cotton gin. The community was also home to a Lithia spring that was used for its purported healing qualities. The Vossburg Lithia Springs Company (based in Gulfport) advertised nationally and claimed that the water healed "albuminuria, diabetes mellitus, uric acid diathesis, [and] cystitis...".

A post office operated under the name Vosburgh from 1882 to 1893, under the name Vosburg from 1893 to 1951, and first began operating under the name Vossburg in 1951.

Notable people
Tom Lester, American actor, lived in Vossburg.
Daryl Terrell, American football player, was born in Vossburg.

Notes

Unincorporated communities in Jasper County, Mississippi
Unincorporated communities in Mississippi